Kilia may refer to:

 Kiliia, a town in Odesa Oblast of Ukraine
 Kiliia Raion, a former administrative region in Odesa Oblast
 Chilia Veche, a town in Tulcea County, Romania
 Chilia branch, a distributary of the Danube
 470 Kilia, an asteroid
 Kilia, an English transliteration of Χηλή, the Greek name for the town of Şile in Turkey

See also
 Chilia (disambiguation)